The United States Navy Seabees Bridge is a through-steel two-hinged arch bridge over the Connecticut River located between Brattleboro, Vermont, and Chesterfield, New Hampshire. It carries the Franklin Pierce Highway, New Hampshire Route 9, which connects to Vermont Route 9 on the Vermont side. It runs parallel to the Justice Harlan Fiske Stone Bridge which it replaced, but which has been retained as a pedestrian and bicycle bridge.

History and construction 
In 1888, a suspension bridge was built over the Connecticut River between Brattleboro and Chesterfield. It lasted until 1936, when it was heavily damaged by a flood. Divers have confirmed that pieces of the old bridge still lie on the riverbed under the current bridges.

In 1937, a steel arch bridge was constructed as a replacement. That same year, it received from the American Institute of Steel Construction the "Annual Award for Merit for Most Beautiful Steel Bridge, Class C".

In 2003 a new steel arch bridge was built, because of concerns about the safety of the old bridge. The new bridge was built for heavier loads. It has a wider deck, more overhead clearance, and utilizes suspender cables instead of thin suspender beams. The old bridge was retained as a pedestrian and bicycle bridge, and in 2010 was named by the State of New Hampshire for the former Chief Justice of the United States Supreme Court Harlan Fiske Stone, who was born in Chesterfield.

See also 
 List of crossings of the Connecticut River

References

External links

Chesterfield Arch Bridge Beautification and Preservation Society

Through arch bridges in the United States
Bridges over the Connecticut River
Bridges completed in 1937
Bridges completed in 2003
Bridges in Cheshire County, New Hampshire
Road bridges in New Hampshire
Road bridges in Vermont
Steel bridges in the United States
Interstate vehicle bridges in the United States